The president of Tunisia, officially the president of the Tunisian Republic, is the head of state of Tunisia. Tunisia is a presidential republic, whereby the president is the head of state and head of government. Under Article 77 of the Constitution of Tunisia, the president is also the commander-in-chief of the Tunisian Armed Forces. The incumbent president is Kais Saied who has held this position since 23 October 2019 following the death of Beji Caid Essebsi on 25 July 2019. 2022 Tunisian constitutional referendum turned Tunisia into a presidential republic, giving the president sweeping powers while largely limiting the role of the parliament.

Elections

The president is elected by universal suffrage by majority during elections held in the last sixty days of the previous presidential term. Article 74 of the Constitution establishes that the right to presidential candidacy is open to every Tunisian national of at least 35 years of age and of Muslim faith. Candidates must renounce any prior nationality upon election.

Voting takes place in the form of a two round winner-take-all election. Article 75 indicates that if no candidate receives an absolute majority of the votes cast during the first round, a second round shall be held within two weeks of the announcement of the final results of the first round. The two candidates having received the most votes in the first round are both presented in the second round, with the candidate receiving the most votes between the two being declared president-elect. If one of the candidates on the ballot dies, a new call for candidates is made, with new election dates set within no more than 45 days; this provision does not apply to the potential withdrawal of candidates. The Constitution also specifies that one may not occupy the position of president for more than two full terms, consecutive or non-consecutive, and that in the event of resignation, the term is considered to have been completed in full.

Terms

Oath 
According to Article 42 of the Constitution of 1959, the president-elect was required to swear an oath before the Chamber of Deputies and the Chamber of Advisors, meeting in joint session, by reciting the following words:

At his swearing-in before the Constituent Assembly of Tunisia on 13 December 2011, Moncef Marzouki gave a modified version of the oath:
According to Article 76 of the Constitution of 2014, the president-elect  must swear the following oath before the Assembly of the Representatives of the People:

Term limits 
Under the Constitution of 1959, the president of the republic was elected by majority to a term of five years by universal, free, direct, and secret elections. According to Article 40 of this constitution, the president may only be reelected three consecutive times, thus limiting the reign of a president to four terms.

However, Habib Bourguiba, after having presented himself in presidential elections four times, expressed his desire to benefit from a lifetime presidency. The National Assembly ratified a lifetime term limit for Bourguiba on 18 March 1975 in constitutional law n°75-13 by amending paragraph 2 of Article 40 as follows:

Article 51 (henceforth referred to as Article 57) was also amended so that in the case of a presidential absence, the prime minister would assume the functions of the presidency.

Article 75 of the Constitution of 2014 reestablished a limit of two terms, whether consecutive or separate, even specifying that this provision cannot be amended in the aim of extending the number of terms.

Succession 
Article 84 of the Constitution of 2014 assigns the Constitutional Court with the task of overseeing a potential provisional vacancy of the presidency and entrusts the prime minister with the duties of the presidency for a maximum period of 60 days. Beyond 60 days or in the case of a definitive vacancy due to resignation, death, or permanent incapacitation, the Constitutional Court entrusts the president of the Assembly of the Representatives of the People with the functions of president for a period of 45 to 90 days.

Role and powers
The president's role and powers are defined in title four, part one of the constitution. In addition to being the head of state, the president is also commander-in-chief of the armed forces. The president is limited to a maximum of two terms, and may not hold a partisan position while serving as president. The president and the prime minister have executive roles, with the executive power being exercised by the president and the government (dual executive). The Assembly of the Representatives of the People has the right to, by majority, present a motion to impeach the president for a grave violation of the constitution; such a motion would have to be approved by a two-thirds majority of both the Assembly and the Constitutional Court.

Article 77 specifies that the president is responsible for the general state of defence, foreign policy and national security, after consultation with the head of government.

Article 78 specifies that the president is responsible for appointing and dismissing:
 The Grand Mufti of the Tunisian Republic
 Individuals in senior positions in the Presidency of the Republic and dependent institutions.
 Individuals in senior military and diplomatic positions, and related to national security, after consultation with the Head of Government.
 The head of the central bank, upon proposal from the head of government after approval from the Assembly of the Representatives of the People.
Article 80 specifies that in exceptional circumstances, the president, after consultation with the government and the president of the Assembly, may take measures necessitated by the circumstances.

Article 81 specifies that the president has the responsibility of signing laws, and ensure their publication. With the exception of draft constitutional laws, the president has the right to return laws to the assembly with an explanation. A returned law requires approval by an absolute majority of assembly members (as opposed to a majority of members present), or in the case of an organic law, three-fifths of the assembly members.

Article 82 specifies that the president may in exceptional circumstances put certain draft laws to a referendum.

Article 87 specifies that the president enjoys legal immunity while in office.

History

Since the promulgation of a republican constitution in June 1959, three years after gaining independence from France, Tunisia has had just four directly elected presidents. The first president was Habib Bourguiba, who became the country's first president after the proclamation of a republic in 1957; he had been the country's de facto leader as prime minister since independence in 1956.  He was formally elected to the post in 1959, and was proclaimed president for life in 1975.  He was removed from office in a coup d'état in 1987 by Prime Minister Zine El Abidine Ben Ali after being declared medically unfit to continue in office. Ben Ali ascended as acting president, was elected in his own right in 1989 and served until 2011, when he was forced from office during an uprising against his rule.  In the country's first free presidential election, held in December 2014, Beji Caid Essebsi was elected in the second round.

For most of its history as an independent state, Tunisia lacked political democracy in the Western sense, and saw widespread violations of human rights. Because of this, presidential elections in Tunisia, such as that of 2009, lacked international credibility. Elections resulted in implausibly high margins for the ruling party, the Constitutional Democratic Rally and its previous incarnations as the Neo Destour party and the Socialist Destourian Party.

Prior to 1999, presidential candidates had to be endorsed by at least 30 political figures—a realistic possibility only for a candidate from a well-organized party like the RCD.  Given the RCD's near-total domination of Tunisian politics, opposition candidates found it impossible to get their nomination papers signed. Even when this requirement was lifted, incumbent Ben Ali was reelected three more times by implausibly high margins; his lowest margin was 89 percent in 2009.

Tunisia's original republican constitution vested the president with sweeping executive and legislative powers. Indeed, within the context of the system, he was a virtual dictator. He was elected for a term of five years, with no term limits. In 1975, five months after winning his third full term, Bourguiba was named president for life. From 1987 to 2002, a president was limited to three five-year terms, with no more than two in a row. However, this provision was removed in June 2002.

The 2014 Constitution retained the presidency as the key institution, but hedged it about with numerous checks and balances to prevent a repeat of past authoritarian excesses. Most notably, a president is limited to two five-year terms, even if they are non-successive. The Constitution explicitly forbids any amendment to increase the length of a president's term or allow him to run for more than two terms.

Under the current constitution, the president is primarily responsible for foreign policy, defense and national security, while the Head of Government (prime minister) is responsible for domestic policy.

2011 presidential transition
Following Zine El Abidine Ben Ali's ousting in January 2011, prime minister Mohamed Ghannouchi invoked article 56 of the Constitution regarding temporary absence of the president to assume the role of acting president. This move was deemed unconstitutional by the Constitutional Court hours later and President of the Chamber of Deputies Fouad Mebazaa was appointed as acting president based on article 57 of the Constitution regarding permanent absence of the president. On December 12, 2011, Moncef Marzouki was elected by the newly formed Constituent Assembly as interim president of the Republic.

Latest election

See also
Tunisia
List of beys of Tunis
List of French residents-general in Tunisia
List of presidents of Tunisia
First Lady of Tunisia
Prime Minister of Tunisia
Lists of office-holders
List of current heads of state and government

References 

 
1957 establishments in Tunisia

da:Tunesiens præsidenter
id:Daftar Presiden Tunisia
ka:ტუნისის პრეზიდენტი